Eastern Iran consists of the Lut Desert, the mountains ranges bordering Turkmenistan, Afghanistan and Pakistan, and  the coastal strip of the Gulf of Oman.

It includes the provinces of North Khorasan, Razavi Khorasan, South Khorasan and Sistan and Baluchestan sharing border with Turkmenistan, Afghanistan and Pakistan. Some references also count Kerman Province to this region.

The major cities are Mashhad, Zahedan, Bojnurd, Birjand, Zabol, Chabahar and Neyshabur and sometimes Kerman.

Climate
Hot desert climate in the plains and the south.
Cold desert climate in the north.
cold semi-arid climate in the mountain ranges.

See also
 Northern Iran
 Western Iran
 Southern Iran
 Central Iran
 Northwestern Iran

References

Subdivisions of Iran